Colégio Pedro II is a traditional federal public school, located in the state of Rio de Janeiro, Brazil. It is the third oldest active college in the country, after Ginásio Pernambucano and Atheneu Norte-Riograndense. The school was created in honor of its past patron, the emperor of Brazil, Dom Pedro II.

Founded during the regency of the Marquis of Olinda, Pedro de Araújo Lima, it was part of a larger civilization project of the Brazilian Empire, which included the foundation of the Brazilian Historical and Geographical Institute and the Public Archive of the Empire, its contemporaries. Others, however, point to limitations of this view, suggesting other motivations for the creation of the college, mainly by pointing out that the transformation of the Seminary of São Joaquim into the College of Pedro II was based on the idea of the Reform of the Constitution in 1834, of building a model to be followed, since the provinces were not able to establish their local education system by themselves. Another group of authors, such as Circe Bittencourt, have established views that dialogue both perspectives.

The format of the Colégio explains a lot of the Imperial civilizing plan: an education that prioritized a good education, but that covered a small part of society, which was sufficient to the Empire's project, insofar as it filled the basic cadres of the bureaucratic and ideological system to the country's leaders, with a curriculum that served these interests, not being so concerned with the formation of a broad mass of minimally trained workers, as would occur at later times in Brazil and already occurred in some places in Europe.

It has 12 campuses in Rio de Janeiro, in the neighborhoods of Centro, São Cristóvão (3 units), Humaitá (2 units), Tijuca (2 units), Engenho Novo (2 units) and Realengo (2 units). It also has a campus in Niterói and another in Duque de Caxias.

History

The Imperial Period 
Colégio Pedro II was founded during the regency of Pedro de Araújo Lima, Marquis of Olinda.

The institution was founded as a result of the reorganization of the old Seminary of São Joaquim, according to the project presented to the regency of the Marquis of Olinda (1837-1840) by the then Minister of Business and Justice, Bernardo Pereira de Vasconcelos. Inaugurated in 1837, on the emperor's birthday (December 2), it was named Pedro II Imperial College. The act was made official by regency decree on December 20, and classes began in March of the following year (1838).

Its facilities were located in the old Rua Larga (now Avenida Marechal Floriano), in the historic center of the city of Rio de Janeiro, whose classrooms still function to this day.

Most students belonged to the economic and political elite of the country, although there was provision for destitute students. The college was to:
Filled with European values of civilization and progress, the students of the Imperial College left with a Bachelor of Arts degree, ready to enter higher education. According to a decree of 1843, the college was the only one to confer this title on its graduates, which guaranteed them the privilege of direct access to higher education courses without having to take preparatory examinations.

From 1857 on, the institution was divided into boarding school and day school, the first modality being installed in Tijuca the following year (1858), where it remained until 1888 when its facilities were transferred to São Cristóvão field (São Cristóvão Unit).

Republican Period 
With the Proclamation of the Republic, in 1889, the name of the institution was changed to Instituto Nacional de Instrução Secundária (National Institute of Secondary Instruction) and, soon after, to Ginásio Nacional. In 1911, it returned to its original name.

In 1937, President Getúlio Vargas granted the law no. 574 of November 9, of the same year, which established in the second article the degree of bachelor in sciences and letters for the students who had finished the last year of high school at the college.

Until the 1950s, it was considered the "standard school in Brazil", since its teaching program was a reference for quality and a model for private schools, which requested recognition of their own certificates from the Ministry of Education, justifying the similarity of their curricula with those of the school.

Due to the large number of applicants to its entrance examination, meaning a growing increase in demand, the institution needed to expand the number of places for enrollment. For this reason, the Northern and Southern Sections (1952) and the Tijuca Section (1957) were inaugurated.

The College today 
As of 1979, the old sections were renamed Unidades Escolares (U.E.) and were complemented by the name of the neighborhood where they were located: U.E. Centro (the pioneer), U.E. São Cristóvão (boarding school), U.E. Engenho Novo (former North Section), U.E. Humaitá (former South Section) and U.E. Tijuca (former Tijuca Section), serving the current elementary school (segment) and high school.

In 1984, the first segment of elementary school (1st to 5th grades), informally called "Pedrinho", was established in the São Cristóvão School Unit. This segment was later implemented in the U.E. Humaitá (1985), U.E. Engenho Novo (1986) and U.E. Tijuca (1987). From this process on, the units of the first segment started to be formally called Unit I and those of the second segment (5th to 8th grades), as Unit II, that is, São Cristóvão I and São Cristóvão II, serving the first and second segments, respectively.

The tradition of excellence in education of the institution was recognized by the Brazilian Federal Government in 1998, when the school received the Quality Award for its Total Quality project in education.

Aiming to meet the great demand for high school education, a new unit was inaugurated in 1999 in São Cristóvão (U.E. São Cristóvão III).

Keeping up with the demand for quality education in the municipality, even though it is a federal institution, the Realengo School Unit was inaugurated on April 6, 2004, as a result of an agreement between the Institution and the Rio de Janeiro City Hall, which thus began to serve the population of the city's West Zone. In 2010, Unit I was inaugurated, offering the first grades of elementary school; in 2012, Realengo became the first unit to open classes in early childhood education.

In 2006, the Niterói Decentralized School Unit was opened and, in 2007, the Duque de Caxias Unit. Both offer only high school.

In 2008, the "Internal Chemistry Olympics of Colégio Pedro II" was instituted, an event that awards prizes to the students on the night of December 1, anticipating the celebration of the college's anniversary, which occurs the following night (December 2).

The college has agreements with public and private institutions, such as the National Observatory, Petrobras, the Oswaldo Cruz Foundation, the National Museum (UFRJ) and others, offering internships and complementary studies to its students. It also offers technical courses, integrated to regular high school, in the areas of environment (São Cristóvão unit), and computer science (São Cristóvão, Engenho Novo and Tijuca units). Starting in 2012, it will offer a music course (Realengo unit).Thus, according to this law, the college equated itself to the IFEs (Federal Institutes) in administrative matters, and consequently the former School Units were called Campuses and the general direction became called rectory.

The college also started offering master's degrees in education under this law.

As of 2020, the Realengo II campus will offer undergraduate courses in the Licenciatura modality: Social Sciences, Philosophy, Geography, and History. Admission is through Sisu.

Anthem 
During the solemnity commemorating the college's centennial, the students' hymn was played for the first time, conducted by Professor Maria Eliza de Freitas Lima, with music by maestro Antônio Francisco Braga and lyrics by the externate Hamilton Elia.

Inspired by the retumbrancy of martial pieces and lyrics exalting the past and certainty of the future, the lyrics bring symbols of positivism.

Notorious Teachers 
Throughout its history, Colégio Pedro II has had renowned professors in Brazilian history.

Notorious alumni 

 Afonso Arinos de Melo Franco, writer, member of the Brazilian Academy of Letters and author of the Afonso Arinos Law;
 Arlindo Cruz, singer and composer;
 Coelho Netto, writer and member of the Brazilian Academy of Letters;
 Fátima Bernardes, journalist;
 Fernanda Montenegro, actress and member of the Brazilian Academy of Letters;
 Floriano Peixoto, President of the Republic (1891-1894);
 França Júnior, writer and patron of chair 12 of the Brazilian Academy of Letters;
 Henrique Francisco d'Ávila, Governor of Rio Grande do Sul (1880-1881) and Ceará (1889);
 Henrique Pereira de Lucena, Baron of Lucena and Governor of Pernambuco (1872-1875), Bahia (1877-1878), Rio Grande do Norte (1872), and Rio Grande do Sul (1885-1886);
 Hermes da Fonseca, President of the Republic (1910-1914);
 Ivan Pinheiro, General Secretary of the Brazilian Communist Party (2005-2016);
 Ivo de Magalhães, Governor of Brasília (1962-1964);
 Jorge Picciani, President of the Legislative Assembly of the State of Rio de Janeiro (2003-2011 and 2015–2017);
 Luiz Fux, Minister of the Supreme Court (2011-);
 Manuel Bandeira, writer and member of the Brazilian Academy of Letters;
 Marco Aurélio Mello, Federal Supreme Court Justice (1990-2021);
 Maria Luísa Bittencourt, State Congresswoman from Bahia (1935-1937);
 Nilo Peçanha, President of the Republic (1909-1910);
 Rodrigues Alves, President of the Republic (1902-1906);
 Washington Luís, President of the Republic (1926-1930).

References

Educational institutions established in 1837
Secondary schools in Brazil
1837 establishments in Brazil